Louis McCarty Little (January 16, 1878 – July 16, 1960) was the 11th Assistant to the Major General Commandant of the Marine Corps.  He was the son of Captain William McCarty Little, USN.

Early years
Little was born January 16, 1878, in New York City, New York and after joining the Marine Corps participated in numerous conflicts including World War I, World War II and the Boxer Rebellion.

By the time he retired he had achieved the rank of major general. He died July 16, 1960, in Newport, Rhode Island, and is buried in Arlington National Cemetery.

Awards and decorations
During his military career he was awarded: China Campaign Medal (1900), Philippine Campaign Medal (1901–03), Marine Corps Expeditionary Medal with four bronze stars (Panama, 1903 and 1909; China, 1913–14; Haiti, 1920–21; China, 1924–27), World War I Victory Medal with Overseas Clasp, Haitian Campaign Medal (1919–20), American Defense Service Medal, World War II Victory Medal, Haitian Medal of Honor and Merit in the rank of "Grand Officer" with Diploma, and Haitian Medaille Milataire (1920).

See also

References

1878 births
1960 deaths
United States Marine Corps generals
United States Marine Corps personnel of World War I
United States Marine Corps World War II generals
Military personnel from New York City
Burials at Arlington National Cemetery